The Very Best ... and Beyond is a greatest hits album by the British-American rock band Foreigner released on 22 September 1992 by Atlantic Records The collection spans the band's history from 1977 through 1987, and includes three new tracks recorded in 1992. The compilation skips over the period in the late 1980s and early 1990s when original lead singer Lou Gramm had left the band, omitting any songs from the 1991 album Unusual Heat.

Track listing

Personnel
 Lou Gramm – vocals, percussion
 Mick Jones – guitars, acoustic guitar, bass, piano, keyboards, background vocals
 Ed Gagliardi – bass and background vocals on 5–6, 10, 17
 Rick Wills – bass and background vocals on 4, 7–9, 11–16
 Bruce Turgon – bass, background vocals on 1-3
 Ian McDonald – guitar, horn, keyboards, background vocals on 5–7, 10, 15–17
 Al Greenwood – synthesizer, keyboards on 5–7, 10, 15–17
 Jeff Jacobs – synthesizer, keyboards, background vocals on 1-3
 Dennis Elliott – drums on 4–17
 Mark Schulman – drums, background vocals on 1-3
 Robin Zander – background vocals on 1-3

Charts

Weekly charts

Certifications

References

External links
Official Foreigner's website

Foreigner (band) albums
1992 greatest hits albums
Albums produced by Mick Jones (Foreigner)
Atlantic Records compilation albums